Potanthus flavus is a butterfly of the family Hesperiidae. It is found from the Amur region of Russia to Japan, as well as in Thailand, the Philippines and China (Jilin, Hebei, Shandong, Hunan, Fujian and Yunnan).

The wingspan is 27–30 mm.

Subspecies
Potanthus flavus flavus
Potanthus flavus alcon Evans, 1932 (Thailand, Malaysia, Singapore)

Hesperiinae
Butterflies of Indochina
Butterflies described in 1875